In probability theory, regular conditional probability is a concept that formalizes the notion of conditioning on the outcome of a random variable. The resulting conditional probability distribution is a parametrized family of probability measures called a Markov kernel.

Definition

Conditional probability distribution 

Consider two random variables . The conditional probability distribution of Y given X is a two variable function 

If the random variable X is discrete

If the random variables X, Y are continuous with density .

A more general definition can be given in terms of conditional expectation. Consider a function  satisfying

for almost all .
Then the conditional probability distribution is given by

As with conditional expectation, this can be further generalized to conditioning on a sigma algebra . In that case the conditional distribution is a function :

Regularity 

 For almost all x,  is a probability measure
 For all A,   is a measurable function
In other words  is a Markov kernel.

The first condition holds trivially, but the proof of the second is more involved. It can be shown that if Y is a random element  in a Radon space S, there exists a  that satisfies the measurability condition. It is possible to construct more general spaces where a regular conditional probability distribution does not exist.

Relation to conditional expectation 
For discrete and continuous random variables, the conditional expectation can be expressed as

where  is the conditional density of  given .

This result can be extended to measure theoretical conditional expectation using the regular conditional probability distribution:
 .

Formal definition

Using the disintegration theorem from the measure theory, it allows us to "disintegrate" the measure  into a collection of measures,
one for each . Formally, a regular conditional probability is defined as a function  called a "transition probability", where:
Thus we provide one measure for each .
 For all ,  (a mapping ) is -measurable, and
 For all  and all 

where  is the pushforward measure  of the distribution of the random element ,
Specifically, if we take , then , and so
,
where  can be denoted, using more familiar terms .

Alternate definition

Consider a Radon space  (that is a probability measure defined on a Radon space endowed with the Borel sigma-algebra) and a real-valued random variable T. As discussed above, in this case there exists a regular conditional probability with respect to T. Moreover, we can alternatively define the regular conditional probability for an event A given a particular value t of the random variable T in the following manner:

where the limit is taken over the net of open neighborhoods U of t as they become smaller with respect to set inclusion.  This limit is defined if and only if the probability space is Radon, and only in the support of T, as described in the article.   This is the restriction of the transition probability to the support of T.  To describe this limiting process rigorously:

For every  there exists an open neighborhood U of the event {T=t}, such that for every open V with 

where  is the limit.

See also
 Conditioning (probability)
 Disintegration theorem
 Adherent point
 Limit point

References

External links
 Regular Conditional Probability on PlanetMath

Conditional probability
Measure theory